Outdoors with Hal Denton is a Canadian nature television miniseries which aired on CBC Television in 1955.

Premise
This wildlife series was hosted by Northwest Sportsman editor Hal Denton.

Scheduling
This half-hour series was broadcast on Mondays at 9:30 p.m. (Eastern) from 20 June to 11 July 1955.

References

External links
 

CBC Television original programming
1955 Canadian television series debuts
1955 Canadian television series endings
1950s Canadian documentary television series
Black-and-white Canadian television shows
Nature educational television series